Tatyana Nikolayevna Levina (born 28 February 1977) is a Russian sprinter who specializes in the 200 metres and 4 x 400 metres relay.

Achievements

Personal bests (indoor)
200 metres - 23.22 s (2006)
400 metres - 51.17 s (2006)

External links

1977 births
Living people
Russian female sprinters
Athletes (track and field) at the 2004 Summer Olympics
Olympic athletes of Russia
World Athletics Indoor Championships winners
Olympic female sprinters